Simeon Mikkungwak is a Canadian politician, who was elected to the Legislative Assembly of Nunavut in the 2013 election to represent the electoral district of Baker Lake. He was elected as Speaker of the Legislative Assembly of Nunavut on May 28, 2019.

He resigned from the legislature in February 2020 for family reasons.

References

Living people
Members of the Legislative Assembly of Nunavut
Inuit from the Northwest Territories
Inuit politicians
People from Baker Lake
21st-century Canadian politicians
Inuit from Nunavut
Year of birth missing (living people)
Speakers of the Legislative Assembly of Nunavut